The Underwater Rugby World Championships is the peak international event for the underwater sport of underwater rugby.  The event is conducted on behalf of the Confédération Mondiale des Activités Subaquatiques (CMAS) by an affiliated national federation.  The championships was first held in 1980.

Championships

References

External links
9th Underwater Rugby World Championship Mens FINAL - Norway vs Germany - video by ISus-Scrofal

Underwater rugby
Rugby